Chthonioi Alexandrian Wicca is a Boston-area family of Alexandrian Wicca-derived covens directly downline from Coven Chthonioi. Coven Chthonioi grew out of the Alexandrian practice of its founders in the 1970s, has an unbroken lineage back to Alex Sanders and Maxine Sanders, and has been in continuous operation since 1974. This coven is the originator of the cycle of rituals that has become known as the Book of the Provider. Other differences between Alexandrian Wicca and Chthonioi Alexandrian Wicca include the worship of the Gods and Goddesses of Greece (Greco-Roman Pantheon and Isian worship) as opposed to the traditional Alexandrian Wicca worship of the Gods and Goddesses of Britain, and changes in rituals to suit this change in mythology.

As in Traditional Wicca, the standard initiation practice is cross-sex initiation (female to male; male to female) but Chthonioi Alexandrian Wicca also accepts as valid same-sex initiations.  As quoted from their statement of identity: "Some branches of the Chthonioi-Alexandrian have incorporated Same-Sex Initiations (SSI) as a way of acknowledging the importance and validity of inner contacts and true connection to the divine regardless of physical sex. Although not universally practiced by all within our Tradition, we nonetheless acknowledge SSIs as equally valid, lineaged, proper Initiations and part of our Tradition."

Because of the acceptance of same-sex initiations, some elders of Alexandrian Wicca do not recognize Chthonioi-Alexandrian tradition as "Alexandrian".

See also
Neopaganism
Alex Sanders

Chthonioi Wicca was created in America and is not viewed by most members of the Alexandrian tradition as being valid members of the tradition. The practices and training of Chthonioi are not originating in any way from its British borne founder Alex and Maxine Sanders.

References

External links
 Chthonioi-Alexandrian Tradition

Alexandrian Wicca
Religion in Boston
Wicca in the United States
1970s in modern paganism